Arun Kumar Chaudhary (born 13 April 1985) is a Nepalese politician and member of the Nagrik Unmukti Party. He was elected in 2022 from Kailali 2 to the House of Representatives. He got arrested on 2 February 2022.

Electoral history
He was elected to the Member of House of Representatives From Kailali 2. He lost Election for Member of Province Assembly from Kailali 2 (B)  and Mayor of Lamkichuha Municipality.

Nepalese local elections, 2017

2017 Nepalese provincial elections

2022 Nepalese general election

See also 

 Nagrik Unmukti Party

References 

Nagrik Unmukti Party politicians
Living people
Nepal MPs 2022–present
1985 births